The Canal latéral à l'Oise is a canal in northern France that, along with the river Oise, connects the Canal de Saint-Quentin at Chauny to the Seine at Conflans-Sainte-Honorine. See under the river Oise for the continuation of the route; the junction is made downstream of the lock at Janville . When a canal is latéral (literally 'running beside'), it follows the course of the river it is named after but in a separate excavated channel. The route described below is the 34 km of canal parallel to the river Oise and 103.5 km of the canalised river Oise.

History 
The canal latéral was built in 1831 to provide a reliable navigation between Chauny and Janville, bypassing the winding course of the river Oise. Initially built to smaller dimensions, the locks were later doubled and enlarged to the Freycinet standard. With the opening of the Canal du Nord in 1965, it was decided to further improve the canal downstream of the junction with this new canal. The canal was made wider and deeper, and two new locks 100 by 12 m were built around 1970.

Development 
The 16-km length of the canal from Pont-l'Évêque to Janville (along with the river Oise beyond Janville to the confluence with the river Aisne) is projected to be replaced by the future high-capacity Seine–Nord Europe Canal.

En route
The PK numbers below go from 0 to 34 at Janville and then decrease from 103.5 to 0 at the Seine.  
PK 0 Chauny junction with the Canal de Saint-Quentin
PK 3  Junction with the canalised river Aisne (heading east towards Abbécourt and Reims)
PK 18 Pont l'Eveque
PK 18.5 Junction (right bank) with the Canal du Nord
PK 33 Longueil-Annel
PK 34 Lock #4, double, at Janville, route continues to the river Seine as canalised river Oise (103.5 km)

See also 
 List of canals in France

References

External links 
 River Oise and Canal lateral à l'Oise  maps and information on places, ports and moorings on the canal, by the author of Inland Waterways of France, Imray
 Navigation details for 80 French rivers and canals (French waterways website section)

Oise
Canals opened in 1831